Anaya de Alba is a village and municipality in the province of Salamanca,  western Spain, part of the autonomous community of Castile-Leon.

The postal code is 37863.

Anaya de Alba is the birthplace of the Filipino-Spanish family "Vicente", whose descendant Bruno Vicente migrated to the Philippines in the early 1900s. The Vicente's are prominent land owners in Negros Oriental, Philippines.

References

Municipalities in the Province of Salamanca